The 2018 Istanbul Open (also known as the TEB BNP Paribas Istanbul Open for sponsorship purposes) was a men's tennis tournament played on outdoor clay courts.  It was the fourth edition of the Istanbul Open, and an ATP World Tour 250 event. It took place at the Koza World of Sports Arena in Istanbul, Turkey, from 30 April–6 May 2018.

Singles main draw entrants

Seeds

Rankings are as of April 23, 2018.

Other entrants
The following players received wildcards into the main draw:
  Marsel İlhan
  Cem İlkel
  Bernard Tomic 

The following players received entry from the qualifying draw:
  Daniel Gimeno Traver 
  Thiago Monteiro
  Marco Trungelliti 
  Elias Ymer

Withdrawals
Before the tournament
  Borna Ćorić → replaced by  Taro Daniel
  Pablo Cuevas → replaced by  Dušan Lajović
  Alexandr Dolgopolov → replaced by  Mikhail Youzhny
  Filip Krajinović → replaced by  Malek Jaziri
  Horacio Zeballos → replaced by  John Millman

Doubles main draw entrants

Seeds

 Rankings are as of April 23, 2018.

Other entrants
The following pairs received wildcards into the doubles main draw:
  Tuna Altuna /  Anıl Yüksel 
  Cem İlkel /  Bernard Tomic

Withdrawals
During the tournament
  Viktor Troicki

Champions

Singles

  Taro Daniel def.  Malek Jaziri, 7–6(7–4), 6–4

Doubles

  Dominic Inglot /  Robert Lindstedt def.  Ben McLachlan /  Nicholas Monroe, 3–6, 6–3, [10–8]

References

External links
Official website

2018 in Istanbul
2018 in Turkish tennis
2018
April 2018 sports events in Turkey
May 2018 sports events in Turkey
2018 ATP World Tour